Richard Holland (died 1661) was an English politician who sat in the House of Commons  between 1654 and 1656. He supported the Parliamentary cause in the English Civil War. 

Holland was the eldest son of Edward Holland of Denton  and was nephew of Richard Holland who was MP  in 1586. He succeeded his father at Denton in 1630. In 1642 he was one of the commanders in the defence of Manchester against the Earl of Derby. He was a colonel in the service of the commonwealth and a firm adherent of Presbyterian party. 

In 1654, Holland was elected Member of Parliament for Lancashire in the First Protectorate Parliament. He was re-elected MP Lancashire in 1656 for the Second Protectorate Parliament. 

Holland died in 1661.

Holland left two daughters - Ann wife of Edward Kenyon of Prestwich and Frances who married Francis Beresford of Bentley.

References

Year of birth missing
1661 deaths
Members of the Parliament of England (pre-1707) for Lancashire
Roundheads
English MPs 1654–1655
English MPs 1656–1658